= Bright Star Shining =

1945 television film

Bright Star Shining was an experimental American television drama short broadcast on 26 January 1945 on Chicago station WBKB. It is significant as an attempt to produce a television drama with as little dialogue as possible, at a time when most TV drama was heavily driven by the dialogue. At the time, network television did not exist, and all shows were technically "local". Stations used this period to try out various ideas to see which worked.

== Plot ==
A woman has to decide whether to divorce her husband, who is overseas in the army.

== Cast and crew ==
- Mary Dean
- Don Faust
- Hitous Grey

Written and directed by Fran Harris

== Reception ==
Billboard magazine gave a generally negative review of the drama, but nevertheless praised the fact it was produced, saying that "Fran Harris, who wrote and directed the show should, however, be given credit for trying for now is the time for video programmers to try as many experiments as possible. Only if the people in the field work out all the kinks and bugs now, will television be ready for general acceptance by the public when the day volume of set sales comes".

== Episode status ==
Methods to record live television (such as kinescope recording) did not exist until late 1947, and were rarely used to record local programs for many years (though a small handful of local kinescopes are known to exist from the late-1940s). No copy of Bright Star Shining is known to exist.
